Cutler Regional Airport  is a public use airport located two nautical miles (4 km) west of the central business district of Cutler, a town in Washington County, Maine, United States.

Facilities and aircraft 
Cutler Regional Airport covers an area of 50 acres (20 ha) at an elevation of 55 feet (17 m) above mean sea level. It has one runway designated 9/27 with a gravel surface measuring 2,950 by 40 feet (899 x 12 m).

For the 12-month period ending August 19, 2010, the airport had 300 general aviation aircraft operations, an average of 25 per month. At that time there were 4 aircraft based at this airport: 50% single-engine, 25% multi-engine, and 25% helicopter.

References

External links 
 Aerial image as of May 1996 from USGS The National Map
 

Airports in Maine
Airports in Washington County, Maine